The Croisière de Bruix (or Bruix' expedition of 1799) was a naval campaign of the French Revolutionary Wars. Planned and commanded by French Vice-Admiral Étienne Eustache Bruix, the operation was an attempt to restore French control of the Mediterranean Sea, lost at the Battle of the Nile in August 1798. Taking command of the French Atlantic Fleet based at Brest, Bruix mustered one of the largest and best trained French fleets to take to sea during the war. Brest was under close blockade by the British Channel Fleet, but Bruix arranged for misleading intelligence regarding an impending invasion of Ireland to fall into British hands, which drew the blockade fleet under Lord Bridport away to the north.  On 25 April 1799 the French fleet of 25 ships of the line sailed into the Atlantic unopposed, sighted the following day by the frigate HMS Nymphe. Reports reached Bridport soon afterwards, but he remained on station off Ireland, anticipating a French attack.

With his route clear, Bruix sailed southwest. On 30 April the fleet passed the Spanish naval base of Ferrol, anticipating a union with the Spanish squadron stationed there, but the Spanish had already sailed and the two forces missed one another. The first British opposition to Bruix advance came on 4 May, when he found the British Mediterranean fleet under Vice-Admiral Lord Keith arrayed between his force and the principal Spanish fleet base of Cádiz. This prevented the Spanish and French fleets from joining together, Bruix instead taking advantage of the prevailing winds to pass through the Straits of Gibraltar unopposed. Keith set off in pursuit, gathering his forces off Port Mahon on Menorca while the French fleet made for Toulon and the main Spanish fleet, which had followed the French and British through the Straits, reached Cartagena. As Bruix resupplied and convoyed reinforcements to the embattled French armies in Northern Italy, Keith remained on station off Cartagena. His operation was hindered by a confused command structure: Keith was only acting commander of the Mediterranean Fleet while Earl St Vincent remained on shore at Gibraltar and Port Mahon, with only such brief sojourns with the fleet as his failing health permitted. Keith and St. Vincent issued contradictory orders throughout the campaign, Keith intent on pursuing the French while St. Vincent was preoccupied with the threat from the Spanish.  This problem was compounded by the behaviour of Vice-Admiral Lord Nelson, commander in the Eastern Mediterranean and subordinate to Keith and St. Vincent. Nelson, embroiled in the complex politics of the Kingdom of Naples and increasingly under the influence of his lover Emma, Lady Hamilton, repeatedly refused direct orders to participate in the campaign.

In early June Keith's fleet investigated Toulon but found the French absent, although a French frigate squadron was intercepted and captured off the port. Turning west, Keith sailed to Genoa but again found that the French had departed ahead of the British, Bruix successfully uniting with the Spanish off Cartagena on 22 June and sailing on 24 June with a fleet of more than 40 ships of the line; at the time the largest naval force in the world. Turning southwest, the combined fleet sailed through the Straits of Gibraltar on 7 July intending to return to Brest. Keith remained off Menorca for sometime, resupplying his ships and repeatedly ordering Nelson to take over protection of the island base, orders which Nelson completely disregarded. Keith's fleet was joined during this period by reinforcements sent from the Channel Fleet under Sir Charles Cotton and Cuthbert Collingwood, but it did not follow the allies through the Straits until 29 July, 22 days behind Bruix. For the next two weeks, Keith chased the Bruix northwards towards the French coast, the British fleet gaining on the French day by day, arriving off Brest on 14 August to discover that Bruix and the combined fleet had arrived safely in the harbour only the day before.

Although Bruix did manage to affect the union of the main French and Spanish battle fleets, the campaign was inconclusive. The strategic situation in European waters remained unchanged; by mid-August 1799 the Royal Navy still controlled the Mediterranean unopposed, free to plan and implement the seizure of French territories in the region without impediment. In Northern European waters the huge allied fleet at Brest presented a considerable threat but remained under blockade by the Channel Fleet. With the exception of a series of fruitless expeditions in 1801 there were no further major French or Spanish operations at sea before the Peace of Amiens brought the war to a temporary close in 1801.

Allied fleets

Royal Navy

Notes

References
 
 
 
 
 
 
 
 

French Revolutionary Wars orders of battle